Triangulum II (Tri II or Laevens 2) is a dwarf galaxy close to the Milky Way Galaxy. Like other dwarf spheroidal galaxies, its stellar population is very old: the galaxy was quenched before 11.5 billion years ago. It contains only 1000 stars, yet is quite massive, having a solar mass to light ratio of 3600. This is an unusually high mass for such a small galaxy.

The luminosity is 450 times that of the Sun. This makes it one of the dimmest known galaxies. The galaxy was discovered in images taken by Pan-STARRS by Benjamin P. M. Laevens in 2015.

Triangulum II is a candidate for detecting WIMPs as a source of dark matter.

References

Dwarf galaxies
Triangulum (constellation)
Milky Way Subgroup
Astronomical objects discovered in 2015